Morgan Paul Ensberg (born August 26, 1975) is an American former infielder in Major League Baseball. Ensberg bats and throws right-handed. He was previously a member of the Houston Astros, San Diego Padres, and New York Yankees. From 2011-12 he was the co-host of MLB Roundtrip on SiriusXM's MLB Network Radio. As of 2019, Ensberg is the manager of the Montgomery Biscuits in the Southern League.

Early life
Ensberg was born in Hermosa Beach, California. He attended Riviera Hall Lutheran School during elementary and middle school. Ensberg was an All CIF Basketball and Baseball Player at Redondo Union High School (Redondo Beach, California).  Ensberg was also named to the Daily Breeze All Area Team in both basketball and baseball his senior year.

College career
Ensberg attended the University of Southern California and played third base. In 1997, he played collegiate summer baseball in the Cape Cod Baseball League for the Yarmouth-Dennis Red Sox. Ensberg was a 1998 All-American and Team MVP for USC's 1998 National Championship team. Ensberg is the only Trojan who has compiled 20 home runs and 20 stolen bases in a single season. Ensberg holds top 10 records in 10 offensive categories.  While attending USC, Ensberg joined the Phi Delta Theta fraternity.

Professional career
Ensberg was drafted in the ninth round of the 1998 Major League Baseball Draft. Aaron Miles was in the next room and wrestled one of the gunmen to the ground before the other one fled, only to be caught later on. The other players involved were: Derrek Nicholson, Keith Ginter, Mike Rose, and Eric Cole.

Ensberg enjoyed a stellar  season, batting .283 with 36 home runs and compiling a career high 101 RBI while helping lead the Astros to the World Series. Ensberg was named to the National League All-Star team at the last minute in 2005, replacing the injured Scott Rolen. He was also awarded the Silver Slugger Award for NL third basemen.

Other than Barry Bonds, Ensberg was the only major league player to record at least 100 walks and have fewer hits than walks in 2006.

On July 31, 2007, the Astros traded Ensberg to the San Diego Padres. This was only days after the Astros traded pitcher Dan Wheeler to the Tampa Bay Rays for utility man Ty Wigginton. Houston paid the remainder of Ensberg's $4.35 million salary. Ensberg hit two home runs and a single in his Padres debut.

Ensberg was not offered a new contract by the Padres and became a free agent on December 12, 2007. On January 31, he signed a minor league contract with the New York Yankees with an invitation to spring training, anticipating to compete for the first base position. On March 22, Ensberg was added to the Yankees 40-man roster.

In 2008, Ensberg hit .203 with a home run and 4 runs batted in for the Yankees. The Yankees designated him for assignment on June 1, and released him on June 8. On June 17, Ensberg signed a minor league contract with the Cleveland Indians. He became a free agent at the end of the season.

On February 9, Ensberg signed a minor league deal with the Tampa Bay Rays and was invited to the major league camp. However, he was released at the end of spring training. After the 2009 season, Ensberg decided to retire from baseball. Ensberg started a public blog and announced his intent to transition into a broadcasting career.

Ensberg is the only MLB player in history to have won championship rings in college (USC '98), rookie league (Auburn '98), single A (Kissimmee '99), AA (Round Rock '00), AAA (New Orleans '01), and to have played in a World Series (2005, Houston Astros).

Coaching career
For the 2011-2012 baseball season, Ensberg was hired as a hitters and infielders coach for the UC San Diego Tritons.

Beginning in the 2013 season, Ensberg rejoined the Houston Astros organization as a developmental specialist at Class A Lancaster. The Astros announced his new role as a Minor League special assignment coach in 2014.

On January 9, 2017, Ensberg was named manager of the Tri-City ValleyCats, Class A Short Season affiliate of the Astros in the New York–Penn League.

On January 19, 2018, Ensberg became the manager of the Buies Creek Astros, Class A Advanced affiliate of the Astros in the Carolina League. Ensberg was named 2018 Best Managerial Prospect in the Carolina League by Baseball America.  The Buies Creek Astros won the 2018 Carolina League with a record of 80-57.

On January 18, 2019, Ensberg became the manager for the Tampa Bay Rays AA affiliate, the Montgomery Biscuits. Ensberg led the Biscuits to a club record 88-50.  Ensberg was named 2019 Southern League Manager of the Year and also awarded 2019 Tampa Bay Rays Employee of the Year.

See also
 Houston Astros award winners and league leaders

References

External links

1975 births
Living people
Auburn Doubledays players
Baseball players from California
Buffalo Bisons (minor league) players
Houston Astros players
Kissimmee Cobras players
Leones del Caracas players
American expatriate baseball players in Venezuela
Major League Baseball third basemen
National League All-Stars
New Orleans Zephyrs players
New York Yankees players
Round Rock Express players
San Diego Padres players
USC Trojans baseball players
Silver Slugger Award winners
Yarmouth–Dennis Red Sox players